Tajikistan sent a delegation to compete at the 2008 Summer Paralympics in Beijing, People's Republic of China. The country was represented by two athletes, both competing in powerlifting. Flagbearer Khayrullo Abdurahimov, however, does not appear on his event's official scoresheet, so he seems to not have been active in the Paralympics.

Powerlifting

Women

See also
Tajikistan at the Paralympics
Tajikistan at the 2008 Summer Olympics

References

External links
International Paralympic Committee
Beijing 2008 Paralympic Games Official Site

Nations at the 2008 Summer Paralympics
2008
Summer Paralympics